Marmaduke Dixon may refer to:

 Marmaduke Dixon (settler) (1828–1895), New Zealand farmer and local politician
 Marmaduke Dixon (mountaineer) (1862–1918), New Zealand farmer and mountaineer